An Austin ring transformer is a special type of isolation transformer with low capacitance and high isolation between the primary and secondary.
It is formed of two interlocking rings: one with the transformer core and primary windings, much like a conventional toroidial transformer and the other with the secondary windings. It is used for providing power to the aircraft warning lights and other devices on a mast radiator antenna insulated from ground.  In the Austin transformer the primary and secondary windings are separated by an air gap, so that the high voltage on the mast cannot get into the low voltage lighting supply wiring, causing safety hazards.  It is named after its inventor, Arthur O. Austin, who graduated from Stanford University in 1903 and who obtained 225 patents in his career.

AM radio stations that broadcast in the medium frequency (MF) and low frequency (LF) bands typically use a type of antenna called a base-fed mast radiator.  This is a tall radio mast in which the steel mast structure itself is energized and serves as the antenna.  The mast is mounted on a ceramic insulator to isolate it from the ground and the feedline from the transmitter is bolted to it.  Typically the mast will have a radio frequency AC potential of several thousand volts on it with respect to ground during operation. 

Aviation regulations require that radio towers have aircraft warning lights along their length, so the tower will be visible to aircraft at night.  The high voltage on the tower poses a problem with powering the lights.  The power cable that runs down the tower and connects to the utility line is at the high voltage of the mast.  Without protective equipment the current from the mast would flow down the cable to the power line ground, short-circuiting the mast.  To prevent this, a protective isolator device is installed in the lighting power cable at the base of the mast which blocks the radio frequency power while allowing the 50/60 hertz AC mains power for the lights through.

One type of isolator is the Austin transformer, a specialized type of isolation transformer made specifically for this use, in which the primary and secondary windings of the transformer are separated by an air gap, wide enough so the high voltage on the antenna cannot jump across.  It consists of a ring-shaped toroidal iron core with the primary winding wrapped around it, mounted on a bracket from the mast's concrete base, connected to the lighting power source.  The secondary winding which provides power to the mast lights is a ring-shaped coil which circles the toroidal core through the center, like two links in a chain, with an air gap between the two. The magnetic field created by the primary winding induces current in the secondary winding without the necessity of a direct connection between them.  The wide gap of several centimeters between the coils also insures that there is minimal interwinding capacitance, to prevent RF voltage being induced in the supply wiring by capacitive coupling.

The Austin transformer is only one of several types of isolators used for mast lighting.  Another simpler more widely used type is a choke.  This consists of an inductor, a coil with many turns of fine wire on a cylindrical form.  An inductor's impedance (resistance to AC current) increases with frequency.  Isolation chokes are constructed to have high impedance at the mediumwave frequencies at which mast radiators are used, but low impedance at the 50 or 60 Hz power line frequency, so the lighting power can pass through up the mast but the RF current from the mast is blocked.  A choke is inserted in each of the 3 lines (hot, neutral, safety ground) that make up the power cable.  The low voltage end of each choke is bypassed through a capacitor to ground, so any high voltage passing through the interwinding capacitance of the choke is bypassed to ground.

References

External links
 

Electric transformers
de:Austin Transformator